Louis Kroh Liggett (April 4, 1875 – June 5, 1946) was an American drug store magnate who founded L.K. Liggett Drug Company and then  Rexall. He was later chairman of United Drug Company. He was a member of the Republican National Committee for Massachusetts.

Biography
He was born in Detroit, Michigan on April 4, 1875. His parents were John Templeton Liggett and Julia A. Kroh.<ref>Who Was Who in America, Vol. 2, (1943-1950), Chicago:A. N. Marquis Company, 1963, p. 323His middle name is often erroneously given as Kohl.</ref>

In 1936 he toured America and parts of Canada with the Rexall Train to promote Rexall stores and products. In 1937 Louis Liggett moved to 170 Ivy Street, in Brookline, Massachusetts.

He died on June 5, 1946, in Brookline, Massachusetts. He was entombed in the Liggett Mausoleum in Newton Cemetery in Newton.

Estate in Chestnut Hill Newton
From 1916 to 1937, Louis Liggett owned and occupied a  estate at 185 Hammond Street in the village of Chestnut Hill in Newton, Massachusetts. The main house, built in 1895, was modeled on Gwydr Hall in Wales.  Musa Liggett died in 1931. The estate was donated in 1937 to Cardinal William Henry O'Connell, Archbishop of Boston, who in 1941 donated it to Boston College, which used it to create its Upper Campus. The main house is now known as O'Connell House  and is the center of the Upper Campus. On April 22–23, 1938, the furniture and other property of the late Musa Bence Liggett were sold at auction by Louis K. Liggett's order at American Art Association-Anderson Galleries in New York City.

Personal life
On June 26, 1895, Liggett married Musa Bence. She was born in Michigan on March 19, 1873 to Lavinia and George W. Bence. Liggett and Bence had three children. Musa died on September 7, 1931 in Plymouth, Massachusetts.

References

Resources
 The Rexall Story: A History of Genius and Neglect'' by Mickey C. Smith 

1875 births
1946 deaths
People from Brookline, Massachusetts
American businesspeople in retailing
People from Newton, Massachusetts
Republican National Committee members